Munaim Yousif  (born 10 October 1981) is an Iraqi former football defender who played for Iraq U20 at the 2001 FIFA World Youth Championship.

Yousif made 2 appearances for the national team in 2002.

References

Iraqi footballers
Iraq international footballers
Living people
Association football defenders
Al-Shorta SC players
1981 births